Herpetogramma aquilonalis is a pearl moth species.

Range
Throughout Canada as well as the Appalachian Mountains in the United States.

Habitat
Boreal forest

Ecology
Larvae are leaf rollers of numerous plants.

References

Moths described in 2021
aquilonalis